Vanush (also Romanized as Vanūsh, Venoosh, and Venūsh) is a village in Kalej Rural District, in the Central District of Nowshahr County, Mazandaran Province, Iran. At the 2006 census, its population was 2,483, in 679 families.

Mamraz Lake, the "Lake of Ghosts"
Vanush has the distinction of being the settlement closest to the Lake of Ghosts, a site of natural beauty featuring an eerie, drowned landscape of half-submerged hornbeam trees resembling phantoms in the mist.

References 

Populated places in Nowshahr County